Mohamed Amissi (born 3 August 2000) is a professional footballer who plays as a winger. Born in Belgium, he represents the Burundi national team.

Club career
On 13 August 2019, Amissi signed a two-year contract with an option for one further season with Heracles Almelo.

On 31 January 2022, Amissi moved to Roda on a 1.5-year contract. On 18 January 2023, Amissi's contract with Roda was terminated by mutual consent.

International career
He made his Burundi national team debut on 11 June 2019 in a friendly against Algeria, as a 58th-minute substitute for Hussein Shabani. He had not played on the senior level in club football at that point.

Amissi played for the national team in the 2019 Africa Cup of Nations, the first continental tournament in their history.

References

External links
 
 
 
 Mohamed Amissi at Heracles Almelo's website

2000 births
Living people
Footballers from Brussels
Burundian footballers
Belgian footballers
Association football forwards
Burundi international footballers
Burundi under-20 international footballers
2019 Africa Cup of Nations players
Belgian people of Burundian descent
Heracles Almelo players
Roda JC Kerkrade players
Eredivisie players
Burundian expatriate footballers
Expatriate footballers in the Netherlands